João Paulo da Silva (born 22 February 1985), known as João Paulo is a Brazilian footballer who plays for Londrina as a defensive midfielder.

Club career
Born in Francisco Beltrão, Paraná, João Paulo graduated from São Caetano's youth setup. A versatile two-footed central midfielder, he signed with the Japanese club Albirex Niigata in August 2010.

After an unsuccessful stint in Japan, João Paulo returned to Brazil and signed for Ponte Preta in March 2011. After appearing regularly for Macaca he moved to Atlético Paranaense on 6 July 2012.

Club statistics

References

External links

1985 births
Living people
Footballers from Curitiba
Brazilian footballers
Association football midfielders
Campeonato Brasileiro Série A players
Campeonato Brasileiro Série B players
Associação Desportiva São Caetano players
São José Esporte Clube players
Londrina Esporte Clube players
União Agrícola Barbarense Futebol Clube players
América Futebol Clube (SP) players
Iraty Sport Club players
Paraná Clube players
Avaí FC players
Associação Atlética Ponte Preta players
Club Athletico Paranaense players
Coritiba Foot Ball Club players
Esporte Clube São Bento players
Esporte Clube Juventude players
J1 League players
Albirex Niigata players
Brazilian expatriate footballers
Brazilian expatriate sportspeople in Japan
Expatriate footballers in Japan